Hidalgo County is located in the U.S. state of Texas. The county seat is Edinburg and the largest city is McAllen. The county is named for Miguel Hidalgo y Costilla, the priest who raised the call for Mexico's independence from Spain.  It is located in the Rio Grande Valley of South Texas and is one of the fastest-growing counties in the United States. As of the 2020 census, the population of Hidalgo County was 870,781, making it the eighth-most populous county in Texas.
Hidalgo County is designated by the U.S. Census Bureau as the McAllen-Edinburg-Mission metropolitan statistical area, which itself is part of the McAllen-Edinburg-Mission-Rio Grande City, Texas combined statistical area with neighboring Starr County.

With a population that is 91.9% Hispanic as of 2020, it is Texas' second-most populous majority-Hispanic county and the fifth-largest nationwide. It is also the largest county which is over 90% Hispanic. It is also the southernmost landlocked county in the United States, and in 2021, it was the largest county in the nation with a total fertility rate above the replacement level (at 2.13).

Geography
The northern part of the county has sandy and light loamy soils over deep reddish or mottled, clayey subsoils. In some areas, limestone lies within  of the surface. The southern part of the county has moderately deep to deep loamy surfaces over clayey subsoils. Along the Rio Grande, brown to red clays occur. Hidalgo County is in the South Texas Plains vegetation area, which features grasses, mesquite, live oaks, and chaparral. Native plants, reduced in recent years by extensive farming, include chapote, guayacán, ebony, huisache, brasil, and yucca.

Natural resources included caliche, sand, gravel, oil, and gas. The climate is subtropical and subhumid. Rainfall averages  a year, and the growing season lasts for 320 days of the year.

Major highways

  Interstate 2
  Interstate 69C (Under Construction)
  U.S. Highway 83
  U.S. Highway 281
  Texas State Highway 107
  Texas State Highway 186
  Texas State Highway 336
  Texas State Highway 495
  Farm to Market Road 364
  Farm to Market Road 490
  Farm to Market Road 492
  Farm to Market Road 493
  Farm to Market Road 494
  Farm to Market Road 676
  Farm to Market Road 681
  Farm to Market Road 907
  Farm to Market Road 1016
  Farm to Market Road 1017
  Farm to Market Road 1423
  Farm to Market Road 1426
  Farm to Market Road 1924
  Farm to Market Road 1925
  Farm to Market Road 2061
  Farm to Market Road 2557
  Farm to Market Road 3072

Adjacent counties and municipalities

 Brooks County (north)
 Kenedy County (northeast)
 Willacy County (east)
 Cameron County (east)
 Starr County (west)
 Gustavo Díaz Ordaz Municipality, Tamaulipas, Mexico (south)
 Reynosa Municipality, Tamaulipas, Mexico (south)
 Río Bravo Municipality, Tamaulipas, Mexico (south)
 Matamoros Municipality, Tamaulipas, Mexico (south)

National protected areas
 Lower Rio Grande Valley National Wildlife Refuge (part)
 Santa Ana National Wildlife Refuge

Demographics

Note: the US Census treats Hispanic/Latino as an ethnic category. This table excludes Latinos from the racial categories and assigns them to a separate category. Hispanics/Latinos can be of any race.

As of the 2015 Texas Population Estimate Program, the population of the county was 841,667, non-Hispanic whites 62,232 (7.4%). Black Americans 2,973 (0.3%). Other non-Hispanic 11,106 (1.3%). Hispanics and Latinos (of any race) 765,356 (90.9%).

As of the 2010 United States census, there were 774,769 people living in the county. 88.0% were White, 1.0% Asian, 0.6% Black or African American, 0.3% Native American, 8.8% of some other race and 1.3% of two or more races. 90.6% were Hispanic or Latino (of any race).

There were 216,471 households, and 179,668 families living in the county. The population density was 363 people per square mile (140/km2). There were 248,287 housing units at an average density of 123 per square mile (47/km2). There were 216,471 households, out of which 54.2% had children under the age of 18 living with them, 65.00% were married couples living together, 18.8% had a female householder with no husband present, and 17.0% were non-families. 14.0% of all households were made up of individuals, and 5.6% had someone living alone who was 65 years of age or older. The average household size was 3.55 and the average family size was 3.94.

In the county, the population was spread out, with 34.7% under the age of 18, 10.7% from 18 to 24, 27.1% from 25 to 44, 18.2% from 45 to 64, and 9.3% who were 65 years of age or older. The median age was 28.3 years. For every 100 females there were 94.40 males. For every 100 females age 18 and over, there were 89.90 males.

The median income for a household in the county was $30,134, and the median income for a family was $31,760. Males had a median income of $22,635 versus $17,526 for females. The per capita income for the county was $12,130. About 32.60% of families and 35.80% of the population were below the poverty line, including 47.4% of those under age 18 and 29.8% of those age 65 or over. The county's per-capita income makes it one of the poorest counties in the United States. In 2009, it was tied with Bronx County, New York for "the greatest share of people receiving food stamps: 29 percent."

Las Milpas, previously unincorporated, was annexed by Pharr in 1987.

Metropolitan Statistical Area
The United States Office of Management and Budget has designated Hidalgo County as the McAllen-Edinburg-Mission, TX Metropolitan Statistical Area.  The United States Census Bureau ranked the McAllen-Edinburg-Mission, TX Metropolitan Statistical Area as the 70th most populous metropolitan statistical area of the United States as of July 1, 2012.

The Office of Management and Budget has further designated the McAllen-Edinburg-Mission, TX Metropolitan Statistical Area as a component of the more extensive McAllen-Edinburg, TX Combined Statistical Area, the 60th most populous combined statistical area and the 67th most populous primary statistical area of the United States as of July 1, 2012.

Government and politics
Hidalgo County tends to vote for the Democratic Party, although there is representation of the Republican Party in some of the offices that affect the county. In the 2012 presidential election, 70.4% of the voters voted for Barack Obama while 28.6% voted for Mitt Romney. The last time Hidalgo County voted Republican was in the 1972 presidential election when Richard Nixon won over 55% of the votes. In the 2020 Presidential election, Hidalgo County saw a significant shift to the Republican Party with Donald Trump increasing the Republican vote from 27.9% in 2016 to 41%. However, as an urban county, the shift was not as large as nearby less densely populated counties.

County services 
The Hidalgo County Sheriff's Office operates jail facilities and is the primary provider of law enforcement services to the unincorporated areas of the county.

County government

Education
The following school districts serve Hidalgo County:
 Donna Independent School District
 Edcouch-Elsa Independent School District
 Edinburg Consolidated Independent School District
 Hidalgo Independent School District
 La Joya Independent School District
 La Villa Independent School District
 Lyford Consolidated Independent School District (partial)
 McAllen Independent School District
 Mercedes Independent School District
 Mission Consolidated Independent School District
 Monte Alto Independent School District
 Pharr-San Juan-Alamo Independent School District
 Progreso Independent School District
 Sharyland Independent School District
 Valley View Independent School District
 Weslaco Independent School District

In addition, the county is served by the multi-county South Texas Independent School District. The Roman Catholic Diocese of Brownsville operates three PK-8th Grade schools, two lower-level elementary schools and two high schools.

The Edinburg campus of the University of Texas Rio Grande Valley (formerly University of Texas-Pan American) is located in Hidalgo County.

All of the county is in the service area of South Texas College. The Pecan, Mid-Valley, Technology, and Nursing & Allied Health campuses of South Texas College are located in Hidalgo County.

Economy 
In 2020, the total value of products produced in Hidalgo was $11.5 billion.

In 1982, 91% of the land was in farms and ranches, with 52% of the farmland under cultivation and 85% irrigated; 51 to 60% of the county was considered prime farmland. The primary crops were sorghum, cotton, corn, and vegetables; Hidalgo County led Texas counties in the production of cabbage, onions, cantaloupes, carrots, and watermelons. The primary fruits and nuts grown in the county were grapefruit, oranges, and pecans. Cattle, milk cows, and hogs were the primary livestock products. Hidalgo is the highest-producing county in the state for oilseeds and dry beans.

The Southern Cattle Tick (Rhipicephalus microplus) is invasive here. Populations here have also become highly permethrin resistant. In 2014 the problem had become so severe in Cameron that spread here (and to other neighboring counties) was feared. A Temporary Preventative Quarantine Area was established in Cameron to preserve efficacy in these counties. This was unsuccessful however, due at least in part to the ticks' infestation of wildlife including whitetail (Odocoileus virginianus).

Media

Newspapers
 The Community Press
 The Valley Town Crier
 The Monitor
 The Mercedes Enterprise
 RGV Business Journal
 The Progress Times
 Texas Border Business
 Mega Doctor News

Radio stations
 KGBT 98.5 FM
 KGBT 1530 AM
 KBTQ 96.1 FM
 KFRQ 94.5 FM
 KKPS 99.5 FM
 KNVO 101.1 FM
 KVLY 107.9 FM
 KURV 710 AM
 KVMV 96.9 FM
* KTEX 100.3 FM
 KQXX 105.5 FM

Magazine
 Contempo Magazine

Communities

Cities

 Alamo
 Alton
 Donna
 Edcouch
 Edinburg
 Elsa
 Granjeno
 Hidalgo
 La Joya
 La Villa
 McAllen
 Mercedes
 Mission
 Palmhurst
 Palmview
 Peñitas
 Pharr
 Progreso
 Progreso Lakes
 San Juan
 Sullivan City
 Weslaco

Census-designated places

 Abram
 Alton North (former)
 César Chávez
 Citrus City
 Cuevitas
 Doffing
 Doolittle
 Harding Gill Tract
 Hargill
 Havana
 Heidelberg
 Indian Hills
 La Blanca
 La Coma Heights
 La Homa
 Laguna Seca
 Linn
 Llano Grande
 Lopezville
 Los Ebanos
 Midway North
 Midway South
 Mila Doce
 Monte Alto
 Muniz
 Murillo
 North Alamo
 Olivarez
 Palmview South
 Perezville
 Relampago
 Salida del Sol Estates
 San Carlos
 Scissors
 South Alamo
 Villa Verde
 West Sharyland

Former census-designated places
 Faysville (annexed to Edinburg in 2015)

Unincorporated community
 McCook

See also

 List of museums in South Texas
 List of museums in the Texas Gulf Coast
 National Register of Historic Places listings in Hidalgo County, Texas
 Recorded Texas Historic Landmarks in Hidalgo County

References

External links

 
 Historic photos of Hidalgo County hosted by the Portal to Texas History
 Hidalgo County in Handbook of Texas Online at the University of Texas
 Hidalgo County Profile from the Texas Association of Counties
 

 
1852 establishments in Texas
Lower Rio Grande Valley
Populated places established in 1852
Majority-minority counties in Texas
Hispanic and Latino American culture in Texas